Alexander Ilich Rodimtsev (8 March 1905  13 April 1977) was a colonel general in the Red Army during World War II and who was awarded the title Hero of the Soviet Union in 1937 and 1945.

Career 
Rodimtsev joined the Red Army in the 1920s. He fought in the Spanish Civil War on the side of the Republicans against Francisco Franco in 1936-1937, where he earned his first decoration as a Hero of the Soviet Union. During the course of the Second World War, he is best remembered for his role in the Battle of Stalingrad, where he brilliantly commanded the 13th Guards Rifle Division which earned him his second order of Hero of the Soviet Union. The division was charged to hold the Germans between Mamayev Kurgan and Tsaritsa Gorge, which his outnumbered and outgunned force successfully did. Rodimtsev was vastly popular with his troops and was well known for his bravery.

In 1943, after the Battle of Stalingrad, Rodimtsev commanded the 32nd Guards Rifle Corps, which included the 13th Guards Rifle Division, the 66th Guards Rifle Division, and the 6th Guards Airborne Division. The 32nd Guards Rifle Corps was an element of the 5th Guards Army, which was a part of the Steppe Front (commanded by Marshal Ivan Konev), and engaged SS Panzer divisions at the Battle of Kursk.

After the war Rodimtsev served as the Deputy Commander of the Eastern Siberian Military District, then served as a military attaché in Albania, before serving again as a deputy commander for a Military District, this time for the Northern Military District.

References

External links
 Warheroes 

1905 births
1977 deaths
People from Sharlyksky District
People from Orenburgsky Uyezd
Communist Party of the Soviet Union members
Third convocation members of the Soviet of the Union
Members of the Supreme Soviet of the Russian Soviet Federative Socialist Republic, 1947–1951
Soviet colonel generals
Soviet military attachés
Personnel of the Soviet Airborne Forces
Frunze Military Academy alumni
Military Academy of the General Staff of the Armed Forces of the Soviet Union alumni
Soviet people of the Spanish Civil War
People of the Soviet invasion of Poland
Soviet military personnel of the Winter War
Soviet military personnel of World War II
Heroes of the Soviet Union
Recipients of the Order of Lenin
Recipients of the Order of the Red Banner
Recipients of the Order of Bogdan Khmelnitsky (Soviet Union), 1st class
Recipients of the Order of Suvorov, 2nd class
Recipients of the Order of Kutuzov, 2nd class
Recipients of the Order of the Red Star
Recipients of the Military Order of the White Lion
Recipients of the Gold Cross of the Virtuti Militari
Officers of the Order of Polonia Restituta
Recipients of the Order of the Cross of Grunwald, 3rd class
Burials at Novodevichy Cemetery